The Last Supper is a 2012 Chinese historical film directed by Lu Chuan. The plot is based on events in the Chu–Han Contention, an interregnum between the fall of the Qin dynasty and the founding of the Han dynasty in Chinese history. The film was originally scheduled to be released on 5 July 2012, but was delayed. It premiered at the Toronto International Film Festival on 8 September 2012.

Plot
The story is told in flashbacks from the point of view of a 61-year-old Liu Bang, the founding emperor of the Han dynasty. Liu Bang has been experiencing nightmares and living in fear and apprehension as he constantly suspects that someone is trying to kill him. In his whole life, he has been afraid of only two persons: Xiang Yu, who fought with him for supremacy over China after the fall of the Qin dynasty; Han Xin, a man who previously served Xiang Yu, but later became a general under him, and helped him defeat Xiang Yu. Liu Bang then reflects on key events in his life, such as the Feast at Hong Gate and the Battle of Gaixia.

Among all his subjects, Liu Bang regards Han Xin, Xiao He and Zhang Liang as the three most important persons who assisted him in overcoming Xiang Yu in the Chu–Han Contention. However, he believes that Han Xin wants to rebel against him and has Han imprisoned for the past six years. Liu Bang reluctantly releases Han Xin and lets him stay in Zhang Liang's residence. Liu Bang's wife, the empress Lü Zhi, eventually forces Xiao He to lure Han Xin into a trap under the guise of inviting Han to attend a banquet. Han Xin was captured, charged with treason and executed, with his dead body suspended inside a bell. Xiao He cuts off Han Xin's head and presents it to Liu Bang. Liu Bang also dies shortly after. It is said that he finally found peace in death because he has been living in suspense and uncertainty.

Cast

 Liu Ye as Liu Bang
 Daniel Wu as Xiang Yu
 Chang Chen as Han Xin
 Qin Lan as Lü Zhi
 Sha Yi as Xiao He
 Nie Yuan as Xiang Zhuang
 Huo Siyan as Concubine Qi
 He Dujuan as Consort Yu
 Tao Zeru as Fan Zeng
 Li Qi as Xiang Bo
 Qi Dao as Zhang Liang
 Lü Yulai as Ziying
 Hao Bojie as Yu Ziqi
 Zhao Liang as Wu She
 Mohe Ta'er as Fan Kuai
 Zhao Xiang as Kuai Che
 Xiaotangyuan as Cao Wushang
 Qi Yixian as Xiahou Ying
 Liu Wei as Xiang Liang
 Dong Bo as Lü Matong

Production
Shooting for The Last Supper started in March 2011 and ended on 1 November 2011. Locations include Xiangshan Film City (象山影视城) in Ningbo, and Kangxi Grassland (康西草原), Beijing. The film is based on the latest archaeological data collected in recent years and aims to provide a new perspective on that part of history.

The film was originally titled 鸿门宴 (Feast at Hong Gate) in Chinese, but was later changed to 王的盛宴 (lit. The King's Supper) to avoid confusion with Daniel Lee's White Vengeance (Chinese title 鸿门宴), which is also based on events in the Chu–Han Contention.

In an interview with The Hollywood Reporter, when asked on how different The Last Supper would be as compared to other Chinese historical films, director Lu Chuan said, "I wish to present to audiences something believable. Many earlier Chinese historical films showcase gorgeous scenes and flamboyant costumes, but what actually occurred in history thousands of years ago was not like this. I want to show history in its true form, and things that really happened in the past." Lu also revealed that to paint a more accurate picture of history, he and his team had invested a lot of time and money. He had read many historical books and texts, and carefully designed the character models, costumes, props, etc.

Casting
Chow Yun-fat and Liu Ye were initially considered for the roles of Liu Bang and Xiang Yu respectively, but eventually the latter was cast as Liu Bang instead and Daniel Wu was chosen to play Xiang Yu.

Principal cast members Daniel Wu, Qin Lan and Liu Ye gained weight to prepare for their roles. Wu felt that he was too slim to portray the robustly built Xiang Yu, so he put on 10 kg by having seven meals a day. Qin increased her weight from 48 kg to 54 kg by consuming foods and drinks high in calories and fat in order to play a middle-aged Lü Zhi. Qin portrayed Lü Zhi again in King's War, a 2012 Chinese television series about the Chu–Han Contention.

Yang Mi had promised director Lu Chuan to join the cast but she dropped out due to conflicts in her schedule.

References

External links
 
 
  The Last Supper on Sina.com

2012 films
Chinese historical films
2010s Mandarin-language films
Films set in the Chu–Han Contention
Films directed by Lu Chuan